was a Japanese classical composer. His works include five symphonies, film scores, a flute sonata, a piano concerto, choral work and art songs, and the opera, Prince Arima.

His work took strong influence from jazz. His best-known works include the film score Matango (1963).

Major works

Operas 
 A Story of Three Women (Le dit des trois femmes) (1964)
 有間皇子 (Prince Arima (Arima-no Miko)) (1963–67)
 Aoi-no-ue

Orchestral works
 Deux mouvements pour orchestre (1946)
 Suite classique (1947)
 Introduction et Allegro (1954)
 Deux prières (1956)
 Symphonietta for String Orchestra (1959)
 Symphony No. 1 (1961)
 Concerto pour violon et orchestre (1969)
 Concerto pour alto et orchestre (1971)
 Symphony No. 2 (1977)
 Concerto pour piano et orchestre (1980)
 Festival Overture (1981)
 Symphony No. 3 "Spring" (1984)
 Memories of Pictures: Suite for Wind Band (1987/2005)
 March "Be Pure, Be Fresh" for wind orchestra (1988)
 Symphony No. 4 "The Summer 1945" (1989)
 Concerto pour violoncelle et orchestre "Autumn" (1997)
 Symphony No. 5 "Man" (1999)

Chamber works
 Trio d'anches for bassoon, oboe and clarinet (1953)
 Sonate pour flûte et piano (1954)
 Suite japonaise Nr. 1 for wind quintet (1955)
 Quatuor à cordes Nr. 1 (1955–57)
 1er sonate pour violon et piano (1963–67)
 Sonate pour violoncelle et piano (1974)
 Aubade for flute, violin and piano (1976)
 Suite "Chants de ville" for alto saxophone and piano (1981)
 Petit pastoral for flute and piano (1983)
 《Hide and Seek》 and 《Tag》: Two Players for Two Marimbas (1988)
 Trio for Violin, Cello and Piano (1995)
 Kaleidoscope No. 2 for marimba (2002)
 Autumn for violoncello and piano (2004)

Piano works
 Sonatine (1965)
 Suite "Kaleidescope" (1966)
 Three Paraphrases Based on Folksongs of Southern Japan (1968)
 Sonatine in Classical Style (1969)
 Festa in the north: Japanese Suite No. 2 for piano by 4 hands (1989)

Vocal works
 Light-coloured Pictures for voice and piano (1948)
 2 Rondels for voice and piano (1951)
 Three Songs Based Man-yō-shū poems (1958)
 Giant's Garden for narrator, mixed choir, orchestra and electronic sound (1962)
 The Four Seasons of the Mountain for mixed choir (1967)

Film music
Bekku composed about 40 film scores from 1954 to 1978.

 Ghost of Hanging in Utusunomiya aka The Ceiling at Utsunomiya (怪異宇都宮釣天井 Kaii Utsunomiya tsuritenjō) (1956)
 姫君剣法　謎の紫頭巾 (1957)
 日本南極地域観測隊の記録　南極大陸 (1957)
 南極大陸 (1957)
 天下の鬼夜叉姫 (1957)
 (遙かなる男 Shizukanaru otoko) (1957) literally: The Quiet Man
 (太平洋戦記 Taiheiyō senki) (1958)
 密告者は誰か (1958)
 黒部侠谷　第二部　地底の凱歌 (1959)
 Matango (マタンゴ) (1963) aka Attack of the Mushroom People
 恐怖の時間 (1964)
 White Rose of Hong Kong (香港の白い薔薇 Honkon no shiroibara)(1965)
 Key of Keys (国際秘密警察　鍵の鍵 Kokusai himitsu keisatsu: Kagi no kagi) (1965) literally: International Secret Police: Key of Keys
 (国際秘密警察　絶体絶命 Kokusai himitsu keisatsu: Zettai zetsumi) (1967)
 (ニイタカヤマノボレ　−日本帝国の崩壊− Niitakayama nobore) (1968)
 (喜劇　駅前開運 Kigeki ekimae kaiun) (1968)

References
 Yoko Narasaki ed. Orchestral Works by Japanese Composers 1912-1992. Tokyo: Japan Symphony Foundation, 1994.

External links
  Sadao Bekku's profile with  music sample
 
  JMDB - Sadao Bekku
 E World Japan

1922 births
2012 deaths
Deaths from pneumonia in Japan
Japanese classical composers
Japanese film score composers
Japanese male classical composers
Japanese male film score composers
Japanese opera composers
Male opera composers
Pupils of Darius Milhaud